The Search for Roots: A Personal Anthology is a compilation of thirty pieces of prose and poetry selected by Italian-Jewish author and Holocaust survivor Primo Levi as part of an abortive project by his original Italian publisher Einaudi to identify the texts which most influenced major Italian writers.

Contents

 "The Just Man Oppressed by Injustice": "The Book of Job", The Bible'
 "A Man of No Account": Homer, New Coasts and Poseidon's Son, The Odyssey "Why are Animals Beautiful?": Charles Darwin, The Origin of Species "To See Atoms": Sir William Bragg, Concerning the Nature of Things "The Pact with the Mammoths": Joseph-Henri Rosny, La Guerre du Feu "The Hobbies": Giuseppe Parini, "The Day"
 "A Deadly Nip": Carlo Porta, "Olter Desgrazzi de Giovannin Bongee"
 "Dystopia": Jonathan Swift, Gulliver's Travels "A Testing Time": Joseph Conrad, "Youth"
 "The Words of the Father": Ludwig Gattermann, Laboratory Methods of Organic Chemistry "Better to Write of Laughter Than Tears": François Rabelais, Gargantua and Pantagruel "A Different Way of Saying 'I'": Thomas Mann, Joseph and His Brothers#The Tales of Jacob "The Romance of Technology": Roger Vercel, Tug-Boat "The Dark Well of the Human Spirit": Herman Melville, Moby Dick "Survivors in the Sahara": Antoine de Saint-Exupéry, Wind, Sand and Stars "The Curious Merchant": Marco Polo, The Travels "The Poet-Researcher": Lucretius, On the Nature of the Universe "The Jew on Horseback": Isaac Babel, Collected Stories "An Irrepressible Quibbler": Sholem Aleichem, Tevye the Dairyman and the Railroad Stories "Pity Hidden beneath Laughter": Giuseppe Belli, The Sonnets "Why We are Not Happy": Bertrand Russell, The Conquest of Happiness "We are the Aliens": Fredric Brown, "Sentry"
 "The Measure of All Things": ASTM D 1382 - 55 T, American Society for Testing Materials
 "Urchin Death": Stefano D'Arrigo, Horcynus Orca "TV According to Leonardo": Arthur C. Clarke, Profiles of the Future: An Enquiry into the Limits of the Possible "Before and after the Crime": T. S. Eliot, Murder in the Cathedral "Death Fugue": Paul Celan, Poems of Paul Celan "Tonie the Winterer": Mario Rigoni Stern, The Story of Tönle "Trying to Understand": Hermann Langbein, Menschen in Auschwitz "We are Alone": Kip S. Thorne, The Search for Black Holes "Afterword": The Four Paths of Primo Levi'' by Italo Calvino

References

Short story collections by Primo Levi
Poetry by Primo Levi
1981 books
Italian poetry collections
Giulio Einaudi Editore books